Iodine fluoride may refer to:

 Iodine monofluoride (iodine(I) fluoride), IF
 Iodine trifluoride (iodine(III) fluoride), IF3
 Iodine pentafluoride (iodine(V) fluoride), IF5
 Iodine heptafluoride (iodine(VII) fluoride), IF7